Turner-Pharr House is a historic home located at Clarksville, Pike County, Missouri. It was built about 1867, and is a two-story, five bay by three bay, transitional Greek Revival / Italianate style brick dwelling.  It has a hipped roof.  It features a three-bay front porch with Doric order columns that may date to about 1900.

It was listed on the National Register of Historic Places in 1991.

References

Houses on the National Register of Historic Places in Missouri
Greek Revival houses in Missouri
Italianate architecture in Missouri
Houses completed in 1867
Buildings and structures in Pike County, Missouri
National Register of Historic Places in Pike County, Missouri